Meanstreak (Henri Huang) is a fictional character appearing in American comic books published by Marvel Comics. The character appeared in the futuristic comic book line Marvel 2099 in X-Men 2099. His creators were John Francis Moore and Ron Lim.

Fictional character biography
Little character backstory is given to Meanstreak, aside from saying that he was a scientist at Alchemax, working alongside Jordan Boone. After Jordan helped Henri break the "Unbreakable" Alchemax contract, Henri left New York, where he eventually ran into Krystalin in Berkeley and was recruited into Xi'an's X-Men, where he was given the codename Meanstreak. Joining the X-Men out of grautide he remained for the thrill the work gave him and for Krystallin, whom he had fallen in love with.

During the origin arc of the comic, Henri acted as team tactician and point man, leading the group through the Synge Casino, searching for evidence to clear suspicion that Xi'an assassinated casino head Noah Synge. After clearing Xi'an's name, Meanstreak leaves the team briefly to search for Jordan Boone, who had gone missing. Aided by Skullfire, Bloodhawk and Krystalin they make their way to New York, when they are captured by the Theatre of Pain. They manage to escape and arrive in New York to find that Boone had been genetically altered into the 2099 version of the trickster god Loki. Along with Doom, Ravage, Punisher and Spider-Man, they manage to defeat the Alchemax created Aesir and then return to Nevada.

Henri plays a mostly background role in the following missions, which include located Mama Hurricane, a member of the mutant underground railroad during the Great Purge and facing off against Master Zhao, the leader of the last generation of X-Men, driven insane by years of psionic drugs.

After Xi'an's defection to the Theatre of Pain, as well as the return of La Lunatica, Henri is approached by Halloween Jack, the latest persona of Jordan Boone.  Together they travel to Las Vegas to enact revenge on the new heads of the Synge casino and children of Noah Synge, Desdemona and Lytton. They easily break in and take over the casino, gaining access to not only the bank accounts of the Synges, but also the rest of the Greater Nevada Syndicate. Henri helps Jack build a Virtual Unreality projector which, when activated, begins warping Nevada and fusing it with alternate dimensional energies. Doom arrives, having recently installed himself as President of the U.S., and quarantines Las Vegas, leaving Jack to lord over the twisted city. After deciding to leave, Henri encounters an alternate dimensional creature (later identified as "Zoomers") at high speed, though it disappears when he slows down, noticing that Krys had arrived. She tells him of Xi'an's treachery and they depart together to help the other X-Men raid the Theatre of Pain's Floodgate facility.

After taking down Floodgate Henri and the other X-Men are installed as the protectorate of Halo City, a new mutant city-state created by Doom. Meanstreak once again maintains his background role, helping patrol the streets and help keep the peace. Toward the end of the book's run Meanstreak encounters the Zoomers again, outside of the Las Vegas anomalous Zone.  They end up surrounding him, drawing him into their dimension where he collides with the ground and is left unconscious. Due to the book's sudden cancellation, Henri's fate is unknown, though he does make a brief cameo in the imprint ending paperback 2099: Manifest Destiny.

Powers and abilities
Henri Huang possesses enhanced speed, stamina, reflexes, and thought process. Meanstreak was fast enough to break the sound barrier, if he pushes himself though only for small periods of time or cover vast distances. His body heals and metabolize edibles at the same incredible rate, but oddly, he does not seem to need more than average sustenance. He is a technological genius, able to manipulate most computer systems with ease.

Reception
 In 2022, CBR.com ranked Meanstreak 13th in their "Marvel: The 20 Fastest Speedsters" list.

Other versions

Timestorm 2009–2099

Meanstreak appears as an X-Man in the Timestorm 2009-2099 miniseries. This iteration retains the same powers, however is portrayed as a young girl.

References

Fictional characters with slowed ageing
Fictional hackers
Marvel Comics mutants
Marvel Comics characters who can move at superhuman speeds
Marvel Comics characters with accelerated healing
Marvel 2099 characters
Characters created by John Francis Moore (writer)